Moment to Moment is an album by saxophonist Houston Person which was recorded in 2010 and released on the HighNote label.

Reception

In his review on Allmusic, Ken Dryden states "In his mid-seventies at the time of this record date, tenor saxophonist Houston Person shows no signs of slowing down; he's accompanied here by musicians who are, for the most part, at least a generation younger. Person's lush tone is a major part of the standards of the date". On All About Jazz, Greg Simmons noted "Those expecting a deeply relaxed, background-music affair may be in for a mild surprise. Person hasn't suddenly become a hyper-aggressive free-jazz screamer, but the disc opens at a quick pace and returns to it periodically throughout ... Moment to Moment has everything to be expected in a Houston Person album, then adding a little bit more, making it another fine entry in Person's string of excellent HighNote releases".

Track listing 
 "Bleeker Street" (Houston Person) – 3:57
 "I Cover the Waterfront" (Johnny Green, Edward Heyman) – 5:56
 "Moment to Moment" (Henry Mancini, Johnny Mercer) – 4:45
 "Freight Dance" (Ray Brown) – 4:33
 "Don't Take Your Love from Me" (Henry Nemo) – 6:09
 "E Nada Mais" (Durval Ferreira, Luís Fernando de Oliveira Freire) – 4:49
 "Just the Way You Are" (Billy Joel) – 6:12
 "Back in New Orleans" (Michael Dees) – 6:04
 "All My Life" (Sam H. Stept, Sidney D. Mitchell) – 3:31
 "Love Won't Let Me Wait" (Vinnie Barrett, Bobby Eli) – 5:47
 "Nina Never Knew" (Louis Alter, Milton Drake) – 3:51

Personnel 
Houston Person – tenor saxophone
Terell Stafford – trumpet (tracks 1-4 & 6-11)
John Di Martino – piano 
Randy Johnston – guitar (tracks 1, 5-8, 10 & 11)
Ray Drummond – bass 
Willie Jones III – drums

References 

Houston Person albums
2010 albums
HighNote Records albums
Albums recorded at Van Gelder Studio